Asterix and the Golden Sickle ("The Golden Sickle") is the second volume of the Asterix comic book series, by René Goscinny (stories) and Albert Uderzo (illustrations). It was first serialized in Pilote magazine issues 42–74 in 1960.

Plot summary
Disaster strikes the Gaulish village when Getafix the druid breaks his golden sickle, as without one, he cannot attend the annual conference of druids, or cut mistletoe for the magic potion which keeps the Roman army at bay. Asterix and Obelix set out for Lutetia (present-day Paris) to buy a new sickle from Obelix's distant cousin, the sicklesmith Metallurgix.

On the way there, they encounter bandits, but easily defeat them, and learn from a fellow-traveller that "sickles are in short supply in Lutetia". In the city, they find Metallurgix missing and make inquiries at a local inn, but the landlord professes to know nothing. He later gives a description of Asterix and Obelix to the devious Clovogarlix, who in turn directs them to his superior Navishtrix, who tries to sell them a sickle at an exorbitant price. They refuse, and defeat Navishtrix and his followers, only to be arrested by a Roman patrol. They are released by the Prefect of Lutetia, Surplus Dairyprodus, and learn from a Centurion that Metallurgix may have been kidnapped by sickle traffickers.

From a drunkard imprisoned by Dairyprodus, they learn Navishtrix has a hideout at a portal dolmen in the Boulogne forest. In Navishtrix's underground store-room, Asterix and Obelix find a hoard of golden sickles, but are attacked by Clovogarlix, Navishtrix and their minions. Upon defeat, Navishtrix escapes, and Asterix and Obelix follow him to Surplus Dairyprodus, who – in front of the Centurion – freely confesses to having sponsored the illegal sickle monopoly for his own amusement. The Centurion releases Metallurgix and imprisons Dairyprodus and Navishtrix; whereafter Metallurgix gratefully gives Asterix and Obelix the best of his sickles. With this, they return to their village and celebrate their achievement.

Commentary
 The world-weary Prefect of Lutetia is a caricature of actor Charles Laughton, who was known for playing Roman statesmen.
 Fans have noted that due to an apparent error by Uderzo, the final pages from page 36 onward are drawn with smaller panels in comic strip format, resulting in larger margins on those pages in the printed book.
 "The great ox-cart race, the Suindinum 24 hours" is a reference to France's 24 Hours of Le Mans sports car race. Suindinum is the old name of Le Mans. The race is titled as the Suidinum 500 in the 2020 American edition. One of the competitors in the race is a caricature of French cartoonist Jean Graton.

Feature film
An animated feature film of Asterix and the Golden Sickle was produced by Dargaud Productions, which had also made a film based on the first book, Asterix the Gaul, unbeknown to the authors. Goscinny and Uderzo reluctantly accepted the first film, but they firmly rejected the second, which was scrapped and never released.

In other languages
 Arabic: أستريكس والمنجل الذهبي
 Bengali: 'এসটেরিক্স ও সোনার কাস্তে
 Bulgarian: Златният сърп
 Catalan: La falç d'or
 Croatian: Asteriks i Zlatni srp
 Czech: Asterix a Zlatý srp
 Danish: Asterix og trylledrikken
 Dutch: Asterix en het gouden snoeimes 
 Estonian: Asterix ja Kuldsirp
 Finnish: Kultainen sirppi
 French: La Serpe d'or
 West Frisian: De gouden sichte
 Galician: O fouciño de ouro
 German: Die goldene Sichel
 Greek: Το χρυσό δρεπάνι
 Hungarian: Az aranysarló
 Indonesian: Asterix dan Sabit Emas
 Irish: Asterix agus an Corrán Óir
 Italian: Asterix e il falcetto d'oro
 Latvian: Asteriks un zelta sirpis
 Norwegian: Asterix og styrkedråpene
 Polish: Złoty sierp
 Portuguese: Asterix e a Foice de Ouro
 Romanian: Asterix si Cosorul de Aur
 Russian: золотой серп
 Scots: Asterix and the Gowden Heuk
 Serbian: Астерикс и златни срп/Zlatni srp
 Slovak: Asterix a zlatý kosák
 Spanish: La hoz de oro
 Swedish: Asterix och guldskäran
 Turkish: Asteriks Altın orak
 한국어 : 아스테릭스, 황금낫을 찾아랏!

Reception 
On Goodreads, Asterix and the Golden Sickle has a score of 4.13 out of 5.

References

 The complete guide to Asterix by Peter Kessler

External links 
Official English Website

Cancelled films|Golden Sickle, Asterix and the
Works originally published in Pilote
Comics set in Paris
Literature first published in serial form
1962 graphic novels
Works by René Goscinny
Comics by Albert Uderzo